Hyde Park High School may refer to:

 South Africa
Hyde Park High School (South Africa) in Johannesburg, Gauteng
 United States
Hyde Park Academy High School, formerly called Hyde Park High School, in Chicago, Illinois
Hyde Park High School (Massachusetts) in Hyde Park, Boston, Massachusetts
Hyde Park Schools, a private school in Austin, Texas, which includes Hyde Park High School

See also 
New Hyde Park Memorial High School in New Hyde Park, New York, US